is a Japanese footballer currently playing as a forward for Albirex Niigata Singapore of the Singapore Premier League.

He scored the goal against Balestier Khalsa to give the team a 1-1 draw, thus winning the 2018 title.

Career statistics

Club

Notes

References

1995 births
Living people
Japanese footballers
Japanese expatriate footballers
Association football forwards
Singapore Premier League players
Albirex Niigata Singapore FC players
Japanese expatriate sportspeople in Singapore
Expatriate footballers in Singapore